Experteer is an online career and recruitment market place. Founded in 2005, the company is headquartered in Munich, Germany. Experteer offers job postings for executive positions in Europe and the US. Christian Göttsch is the CEO of Experteer.

History
Experteer was founded in 2005 with support from investors, including Holtzbrinck Ventures, eVentures and Wellington Partners and it launched its service in 2006. In 2010, Experteer began offering Business-to-Business services for headhunters and recruiters. In 2012, Experteer launched their first mobile app for iPhone, and in 2015, an Android version.

International markets
Experteer's first international expansion was in the UK and PAN Europe, in 2007. Individual country versions for France, Switzerland, Italy and Austria were launched in 2008. Further expansion in the Netherlands, Spain and US took place in 2009.

See also
 Employment website

References

External links
Official Website
Recruiting Management

Employment agencies of Germany